Alanköy (literally "field village") is a Turkish place name that may refer to the following places in Turkey:

 Alanköy, Bigadiç, a village
 Alanköy, Çanakkale
 Alanköy, Göynücek, a village in the district of Göynücek, Amasya Province
 Alanköy, Göynük, a village in the district of Göynük, Bolu Province
 Alanköy, Hamamözü, a village in the district of Hamamözü, Amasya Province
 Alanköy, Nallıhan, a village in the district of Nallıhan, Ankara Province
 Alanköy, Vezirköprü, a village in the district of Vezirköprü, Samsun Province
 Alanköy, Yeşilova